Journey to Portugal (Viagem a Portugal in Portuguese) is a non-fiction book on Portugal by Nobel Prize-winning author José Saramago. It was first published in 1981 by Círculo de Leitores e Editorial Caminho.

Critical assessment

An English language translation was published in 2001. A review in Publishers Weekly praised the book, calling it a "monumental work, a literary hybrid that intermingles an intimate portrait of a nation with aspects of a novel, travel log and guide book." Writing in The New York Times, Michael Pye was critical of the book, saying "As books of travel go, this one goes wrong from the start; it is downright solipsistic", and concluded that the book was better as a guide to Saramago rather than as a guide to Portugal. The book was also reviewed in World Literature Today, The Washington Post, New Statesman, and The Spectator.

References

Works by José Saramago
1981 non-fiction books
Portuguese-language works
Books about Portugal